Martti Kykkling (7 May 1857, Säkkijärvi – 28 September 1917) was a Finnish farmer and politician. He was a member of the Diet of Finland from 1899 to 1906 and of the Parliament of Finland from 1913 to 1916, representing the Young Finnish Party.

References

1857 births
1917 deaths
People from Vyborg District
People from Viipuri Province (Grand Duchy of Finland)
Young Finnish Party politicians
Members of the Diet of Finland
Members of the Parliament of Finland (1913–16)